Kogutud teosed may refer to two albums by Urmas Alender:
Kogutud teosed. 1968-1980. Esimene osa.
Kogutud teosed. 1981-1993. Teine osa.